Grasmere is an abandoned service stop in the southwestern part of the U.S. state of Idaho, in Owyhee County.  Located on State Highway 51, it is 32.5 miles (52.3 km) north of the border with Nevada and 58.5 miles (94.1 km) south of Mountain Home. Grasmere was the former site of a small gas station/bar&grill/post office.

The site is now occupied by a remote United States Air Force station manned by active duty airmen from the nearby Mountain Home Air Force Base and Idaho Air National Guard airmen from Gowen Field in Boise.  The station operates the flight training range over Bruneau Canyon of the Bruneau River just east of here for aircraft from their bases and other nearby bases in the region (such as Hill Air Force Base and Fairchild Air Force Base). There is also an unattended general aviation airport in service since April 1956, owned by the Idaho Transportation Department.

In 2000, the average median household income for the ZIP Code Tabulation Area that includes Grasmere and Riddle was $30,921.

Grasmere was the fictional location for the 2008 Jacquie Rogers novel, Down Home Ever Lovin' Mule Blues.

References

Ghost towns in Idaho
Boise metropolitan area